Nikolskoye is a rural locality (a selo) and the administrative center of Aleutsky District of Kamchatka Krai, Russia, located on Bering Island in the Commander Islands chain. Population:  It is the only remaining inhabited locality in the district.

History
It was founded in 1826 by Aleut (Unangan) settlers from Atka Island in the Aleutian Islands who were brought there by Russian fur traders. While engaging to some extent in the traditional pursuits of whaling and sealing with harpoons and spears, they were primarily employed in the harvest of fur-bearing animals, notably sea otters and fur seals.

Demographics
Currently, the population is divided roughly evenly between Russians and Aleuts, but mixing between the two is common.

Economy
The current economy is based primarily on fishing, especially the harvest of salmon caviar, mushroom gathering, and government services and subsidies. Despite living in an environment that is extremely rich with wildlife, the inhabitants of the island are very restricted in the use of these resources since almost the entire island is a nature preserve. In the years following the dissolution of the Soviet Union, poaching of fish, Arctic fox, reindeer (which were introduced to the island), and migratory waterfowl was widespread, but there is virtually no harvest of marine mammals due to strict protection.

Transportation
Nikolskoye is served by the Nikolskoye Airport.

Climate
Like the rest of Kamchatka Krai, Nikolskoye has a subarctic climate (Dfc), though the ocean makes temperatures much less extreme than interior Siberia, with winters being about four degrees milder than in Petropavlovsk-Kamchatsky. The transition to the subpolar oceanic climate of southwest Alaska to the east is very apparent, especially in the extremely low sunshine hours, which average only around 2.8 per day due to the consistent fog from the Aleutian Low and the Oyashio Current on its western flank.

Religion
The first church of Nikolskoye was dedicated to Saint Nicholas and Saint Innocent of Irkutsk, the Enlightener of Siberia. It was built in 1799 by the Russian-American Company. The second building was dedicated in the 1890s and closed after the October Revolution. It was then used as a local club, then a hostel. The building burned down in 1983. A new church was built in the center of the village, a location not subject to tsunamis. It was built in Petropavlovsk-Kamchatsky, dismantled, shipped to the island and reassembled in September 2012.

See also
Preobrazhenskoye, Kamchatka Oblast, a village which existed on Medny Island

References

Notes

Sources

Rural localities in Kamchatka Krai
Commander Islands
Populated places established in 1826
1826 establishments in the Russian Empire